FC Berezniki was a Russian football team from Berezniki. It played professionally in 1958, 1960 to 1970 and 2001. Their best result was 9th spot in the Zone IV Russian SFSR of the Soviet First League in 1960.

Team name and location history
 1947–1970: FC Khimik Berezniki
 1971–1991: did not exist
 1992–1993: FC Sodovik Berezniki
 1994–1998: did not exist
 1999–2000: FC Titan Berezniki
 2001: FC Berezniki

External links
  Team history by footballfacts

Association football clubs established in 1947
Association football clubs disestablished in 2002
Football clubs in Russia
Sport in Perm Krai
1947 establishments in the Soviet Union
2002 disestablishments in Russia